Romantic is the third studio album by the German gothic metal band Darkseed. It was released in 1998, with Nuclear Blast. Songs 1-4 are from the band's 1996 ep, "Romantic Tales", and songs 5-8 are from the demo, "Darksome Thoughts" originally released in 1993,

Track listing
"Dream Recalled on Waking" - 03:15 
"In Broken Images" - 07:29 
"Above the Edge of Doom" - 05:24 
"A Charm for Sound Sleeping" - 03:02 
"Last Dream" - 05:45 
"Frozen Tears" - 07:53 
"Atoned for Cries" - 08:52
"Luctu Perditus" - 02:16  
"Atoned for Cries (Rough Mix)" - 05:30

Lineup
Stefan Hertrich - Vocals, bass
Andi Wecker - Guitars
Jacek Dworok - Guitars
Harald Winkelr - Drums

Guest Musicians:
Veronika Marte - Female Vocals
Marlene Willce - Violin
Christian Bystron - Guitar Solos

References

External links
Darkseed Official Site 

Darkseed (band) albums
Nuclear Blast albums
1999 albums